Phạm Phật was the king of Champa from 349 to 380, and the son of Fan Wen. 

In 353, the King was defeated by the Jin governor of Jiaozhi.  The governor also recaptured Rinan, which had been captured by Fan Fo's predecessor, Fan Wen.

References

Kings of Champa
4th-century monarchs in Asia
4th-century Vietnamese people